The 1907 Men's World Weightlifting Championships were held in Frankfurt, Germany on May 19, 1907. There were 23 men in action from 3 nations. It was the 10th World Weightlifting Championships.

Medal summary

Medal table

References
 Lightweight Results
 Middleweight Results
 Heavyweight Results
 Results
 Weightlifting World Championships Seniors Statistics

External links
 International Weightlifting Federation

World Weightlifting Championships
World Weightlifting Championships
World Weightlifting Championships
Sports competitions in Frankfurt
International weightlifting competitions hosted by Germany
20th century in Frankfurt